Khnumhotep (alt. Khnumhotpe, Khnemhotpe) is an ancient Egyptian personal theophoric name which may refer to:
Khnumhotep, an Overseer of the Manicurists under pharaoh Nyuserre (5th Dynasty), famous for his tomb shared with Niankhkhnum
Khnumhotep I, a nomarch under pharaoh Amenemhat I (12th Dynasty)
Khnumhotep II, a nomarch under pharaoh Amenemhat II and Senusret II (12th Dynasty), and grandson of Khnumhotep I
Khnumhotep III, a vizier under pharaohs Senusret II and Senusret III (12th Dynasty), and son of Khnumhotep II
Khnumhotep IV, a nomarch, son and successor of Khnumhotep II and brother of Khnumhotep III

Ancient Egyptian given names
Theophoric names